Nesvík is a village on the east coast of the Faroese island of Streymoy, located in the Sunda municipality.

In 2020 its population was 0 with the last inhabitants leaving in 2016. Nesvík is home to a religious camp of the conservative Inner Mission of the national church, and a conference center called Leguhusið í Nesvík. Its name is derived from the Faroese words for cape and bay.

See also
 List of towns in the Faroe Islands

External links
 Evangeliihúsið in Torshavn, sponsors of activities in Nesvík
 Danish website with photos of Nesvík

Populated places in the Faroe Islands